Daniel Gilmour Drummond (27 April 1891 – 1 March 1949) was a Scottish professional footballer who played in the Scottish League for Queen's Park and Motherwell as an outside right.

Personal life 
In November 1915, over a year after Britain's entry into the First World War, Drummond enlisted in the Royal Naval Volunteer Reserve and was commissioned in April 1917. In November 1917, while serving with the Royal Naval Division, he was wounded in the left leg and evacuated to Seafield War Hospital, Leith. Drummond was demobbed in February 1919 and the leg wound ended his football career.

References

1891 births
1949 deaths
Scottish footballers
Scottish Football League players
Association football outside forwards
Queen's Park F.C. players
Footballers from Glasgow
Royal Naval Volunteer Reserve personnel of World War I
Motherwell F.C. players
People from Govanhill and Crosshill
63rd (Royal Naval) Division soldiers
Royal Navy officers of World War I
Military personnel from Glasgow